Richard Wallace "Rick" Bloomingdale is a labor union activist who has served as President of the Pennsylvania AFL–CIO since 2010.

He began his career with the American Federation of State, County and Municipal Employees in 1977, where he worked as a Project Staff Representative of Local 449 and as Assistant Director and State Political/Legislative Director of AFSCME Council 13. In 1994, he was named Secretary-Treasurer of the Pennsylvania AFL–CIO. In 2010, he was elected President of the Pennsylvania AFL–CIO.

In 2002, he was named to the PoliticsPA "Sy Snyder's Power 50" list of politically influential Pennsylvanians. He was also named to the PoliticsPA list of "Pennsylvania's Top Political Activists."

He has lectured on the topic of "workforce development" at the U.S. Army War College in Carlisle, Pennsylvania. He was named to the Pennsylvania Unemployment Compensation Board of Review in 2003 and was appointed chairman in August 2005.

In 2020, Bloomingdale was elected to be a member of the Democratic National Committee.

References

External links
 President Richard W. Bloomingdale official website

Living people
AFL–CIO people
Political activists from Pennsylvania
2012 United States presidential electors
Trade unionists from Pennsylvania
People from Harrisburg, Pennsylvania
University of Arizona alumni
American Federation of State, County and Municipal Employees people
Year of birth missing (living people)
2020 United States presidential electors
Pennsylvania Democrats